The women's 500 metres sprint event at the 2010 Asian Games was held in Guangzhou Velodrome, Guangzhou on 23 November.

Schedule
All times are China Standard Time (UTC+08:00)

Results

Heats

Heat 1

Heat 2

Final

References

External links
 
 2010 Asian Games - Roller Sports - Competition Schedule by Event

Roller sports at the 2010 Asian Games